Delmiro Évora Nascimento (born 29 August 1988), known as Delmiro, is a Cape Verdean professional footballer who plays as a defender for Cypriot club Aris Limassol FC.

Club career
Delmiro made his professional debut in the Segunda Liga for União da Madeira on 11 August 2013 in a game against Desportivo das Aves.

On 9 August 2019, Delmiro joined Aris Limassol FC in Cyprus.

International career
Delmiro earned his only international cap in a 0–0 (4–3) penalty shootout win over Andorra on 3 June 2018.

Personal
He is the younger brother of fellow Cape Verde international Vozinha.

References

External links
 
 

1988 births
Living people
People from Mindelo
Cape Verdean footballers
Association football defenders
Cape Verde international footballers
Batuque FC players
Sport Benfica e Castelo Branco players
Progresso Associação do Sambizanga players
C.F. União players
S.C. Farense players
Varzim S.C. players
Arenas Club de Getxo footballers
Aris Limassol FC players
Cape Verdean National Championships players
Liga Portugal 2 players
Segunda División B players
Cape Verdean expatriate footballers
Cape Verdean expatriate sportspeople in Portugal
Cape Verdean expatriate sportspeople in Angola
Cape Verdean expatriate sportspeople in Spain
Cape Verdean expatriate sportspeople in Cyprus
Expatriate footballers in Portugal
Expatriate footballers in Angola
Expatriate footballers in Spain
Expatriate footballers in Cyprus